Altenburger Land I is an electoral constituency (German: Wahlkreis) represented in the Landtag of Thuringia. It elects one member via first-past-the-post voting. Under the current constituency numbering system, it is designated as constituency 43. It covers the western part of Altenburger Land.

Altenburger Land I was created for the 1994 state election. Originally named Altenburg I, it was renamed after the 1994 election. Since 2019, it has been represented by Thomas-Otto Rudy of Alternative for Germany (AfD).

Geography
As of the 2019 state election, Altenburger Land I covers the western part of Altenburger Land, specifically the municipalities of Dobitschen, Göhren, Göllnitz, Gößnitz, Heukewalde, Heyersdorf, Jonaswalde, Kriebitzsch, Löbichau, Lödla, Lucka, Mehna, Meuselwitz, Monstab, Ponitz, Posterstein, Rositz, Schmölln, Starkenberg, Thonhausen, and Vollmershain.

Members
The constituency was held by the Christian Democratic Union (CDU) from its creation in 1994 until 2019, during which time it was represented by Fritz Schröter (1994–2014) and Simone Schulze (2014–2019). It was won by Alternative for Germany in 2019, and is represented by Thomas-Otto Rudy.

Election results

2019 election

2014 election

2009 election

2004 election

1999 election

1994 election

References

Electoral districts in Thuringia
1994 establishments in Germany
Altenburger Land
Constituencies established in 1994